

External links 

Lists of 2013 term United States Supreme Court opinions